Laville Junior-Senior High School is a public high school located in Lakeville, Indiana.

Athletics
Laville Junior-Senior High School's athletic teams are the Lancers and they compete in the Hoosier North Athletic Conference. The school offers a wide range of athletics including:

Baseball
Basketball (Men's and Women's)
Cheerleading
Cross Country (Men's and Women's)
football
Golf (Men's and Women's)
Soccer (Men's and Women's)
Softball
Tennis (Men's and Women's)
Track and Field (Men's and Women's)
Volleyball
Wrestling

Football
The 2015 Laville Junior-Senior High School Varsity football team went 9-3 overall in the season, losing to Northfield High School in the Sectional Championships on November 6, 2015.

See also
 List of high schools in Indiana

References

External links
 Official website
 Athletics Twitter page

Public high schools in Indiana
Schools in St. Joseph County, Indiana
Lakeville, Indiana